Alleluia is a 2014 Belgian-French horror-drama film directed by Fabrice Du Welz. It was screened as part of the Directors' Fortnight section at the 2014 Cannes Film Festival. It received eight nominations at the 6th Magritte Awards, including Best Director for Du Welz.

Cast
 Lola Dueñas as Gloria
 Helena Noguerra as Solange
 Laurent Lucas as Michel
 Stéphane Bissot as Madeleine
 David Murgia as Father Luis

References

External links
 

2014 films
2014 drama films
2010s horror drama films
Belgian horror drama films
French horror drama films
2010s French-language films
Films directed by Fabrice Du Welz
French-language Belgian films
2010s French films